Brampton–Georgetown (also known as Brampton–Halton Hills) was a federal electoral district in Ontario, Canada, that was represented in the House of Commons of Canada from 1979 to 1988.

The riding was represented from 1979 to 1988 by the Honourable John McDermid of the Progressive Conservative Party of Canada.

It was created as "Brampton–Halton Hills" riding in 1976 from parts of Halton, Mississauga and Peel—Dufferin—Simcoe ridings. It was renamed "Brampton–Georgetown" in 1977. It consisted of city of Brampton, and the northern part of the Town of Halton Hills.

The electoral district was abolished in 1987 when it was redistributed between Brampton and Halton—Peel ridings.

Members of Parliament

Election results

|}

|}

|}

See also 
 List of Canadian federal electoral districts
 Past Canadian electoral districts

External links 
 Riding history from the Library of Parliament

Former federal electoral districts of Ontario
Politics of Brampton